The 1961 Florida Gators football team represented the University of Florida during the 1961 NCAA University Division football season. The season was Ray Graves' second as the head coach of the Florida Gators football team, and the Gators posted their only losing season in Graves' ten years as their coach.  Graves' 1961 Florida Gators finished with a 4–5–1 overall record and a 3–3 record in the Southeastern Conference (SEC), placing sixth among the twelve SEC teams.

Before the season
The Gators attempted LSU coach Paul Dietzel's three-platoon system.

Schedule

Primary source: 2015 Florida Gators Football Media Guide

Attendance figures: University of Florida 1962 Football Brochure.

References

Bibliography
 

Florida
Florida Gators football seasons
Florida Gators football